Slow Burn is a 1986 American film noir television movie for Showtime presented by Joel Schumacher (as executive producer) and directed by Matthew Chapman, who adapted the screenplay from the novel Castles Burning by . The cast includes Eric Roberts, Beverly D'Angelo, Dennis Lipscomb, Raymond J. Barry, Johnny Depp, Anne Schedeen, Henry Gibson, Victoria Catlin, and Dan Hedaya.

Plot
Jacob Asch (Roberts) is hired by Gerald McMurty (Barry) to find his ex-wife Laine and their son in Palm Springs. Jacob finds Laine and a teenager named Donnie who may or may not be Gerald's son. He also finds an intricate web of deceit and betrayal that begin to lead to death. He takes it upon himself to unravel the mystery and find out who is killing people and why.

Production
Johnny Depp appeared as Donnie Fleischer, the missing, insightful, rich son of McMurty who only wants to be loved. The film was set and shot in Palm Springs, California.

References

External links
 
 

1986 television films
1986 films
1986 crime drama films
1980s mystery drama films
American crime drama films
American detective films

American television films
Crime television films
Films about murder
Films based on American novels
Films based on crime novels
Films directed by Matthew Chapman
Films scored by Loek Dikker
Films set in Palm Springs, California
Films shot in California
American neo-noir films
1980s English-language films
1980s American films